Grigoryevka is a rural locality (a khutor) in Volokonovsky District, Belgorod Oblast, Russia. The population was 10 as of 2010. There is one street.

Geography 
Grigoryevka is located 30 km west of Volokonovka (the district's administrative centre) by road. Krinichnoye is the nearest rural locality.

References 

Rural localities in Volokonovsky District